The Empire B Junior C Hockey League is a former Junior "C" ice hockey league in Ontario, Canada, sanctioned by the Ontario Hockey Association.  The league was merged into the Provincial Junior Hockey League as the Tod Division in the summer of 2016.

Eastern Ontario Junior "C" Hockey League 1989-1996
Empire B Junior "C" Hockey League 1996-2016

History

Formed in 1989 as the Eastern Ontario Junior C Hockey League, the league had to change its name in 1995 to avoid ongoing confusion with the neighbouring Ottawa District Hockey Association's long running Eastern Ontario Junior C Hockey League. The forerunner of the EBJCHL was the Quinte-St. Lawrence Junior C Hockey League, which merged into the Central Junior C Hockey League in 1986.

The league features six franchises, which are located through Central-eastern Ontario in Amherstview, Campbellford, Gananoque, Napanee, Port Hope, and Picton. The Port Hope Panthers is the new name of the transferred Colborne Cobras franchise.

The teams play a 40-game regular season, with four home and away dates against each of the other Empire B teams. The top four teams make the playoffs — two rounds of best-of-seven play. The Empire playoff champions advance to the OHA quarterfinals against the Central champions and compete for an All-Ontario Championship and the Clarence Schmalz Cup. In its 20-year history, two Empire B teams have won the Schmalz Cup. Napanee Raiders were the first in 1993. On May 1, 2013, the Picton Pirates became the second team in Empire league history to win the Clarence Schmalz Cup as OHA Junior C champions, defeating the Essex 73's of the Great Lakes Junior C Hockey League 4-games-to-1.

The Empire league has had a number of winners of the OHA Junior C Player of the Year award. Most recently, Napanee's Pete Sergeant took the honours in 2008-2009. Among the previous winners are Jason Sutton (Napanee), Adam Walsh (Picton), Joe Curry (Campbellford), and Ryan Zufelt (Amherstview).

At the conclusion of the 2014-15 hockey season the Eastern Ontario Junior B Hockey League announced a re-organization which saw them remove six teams from the league. One of those teams, the Gananoque Islanders immediately petitioned and was accepted into the Empire B Junior C League.

Following the 2015-16 seasons the Empire B Junior C Hockey League amalgamated with the other southern Ontario junior "C" hockey leagues and became a division within the Provincial Junior Hockey League.

Teams

2015-2016 League Playoffs
For the Ontario Hockey Association "All-Ontario Jr. "C" Championship", please go to the Clarence Schmalz Cup.

Tod Trophy Playoff Champions

Regular season champions

(*) At times in the 1960s, the Junior B and C leagues in Eastern Ontario played as a single league.  In those years, listed is the best Junior C team in the joint standings.

Former teams
 Brighton Buzz
 Frontenac Flyers
 Deseronto Storm
 Madoc Wildcats
 Trenton Golden Hawks

Quinte-St. Lawrence teams
 Bancroft Juniors
 Brighton Bruins
 Campbellford Merchants
 Clayton Thunderbirds
 Ernestown Dynamiters
 Frankford Huskies
 Gananoque G-Men
 Madoc Hurricanes
 Napanee Warriors
 Wellington Dukes

Professional alumni
The league has had a few graduates make it to the NHL. In 2006, Carolina's Justin Williams became the league's first graduate to hoist the Stanley Cup. He played with the former Colborne/Brighton franchise. Former Amherstview Jets defencemen Jay McKee (Pittsburgh Penguins), Bryan Allen (Florida Panthers), and Kip Brennan (New York Islanders) have also skated in the pro league.

National Hockey League
Bryan Allen (Ernestown 1995-96)
Steve Bancroft (Madoc 1985-86)
Jay McKee (Ernestown 1992-93)
Justin Williams (Colborne 1997-98)

References

External links
Empire B Junior C Hockey League website

C
C